Black Mamba is an inverted roller coaster built by Bolliger & Mabillard in the German theme park Phantasialand. The ride is situated in the "Deep in Africa" area of the park and is named after the black mamba snake. Theming in the area largely draws from the mud architecture of Western Africa, especially the cities of Timbuktu and Djenne.

Ride experience

The ride is an inverted roller coaster, whereby the trains travel underneath the rails. The ride travels through ravines and tunnels, similar to Nemesis at Alton Towers.

The track was built from 70 individual parts with 0.15mm of manufacturing tolerance which prevents noticeable transitions between sections. Construction began at four separate parts of the ride which were joined together to complete the circuit. The hollow rails were filled with sand to dampen the noise created by passing trains.

During the ride, forces are created of up to 4.0G. In ten places the guests experience so-called "Near Misses", where the course passes near the walls giving the impression of an impending collision.

Black Mamba features a helix with the smallest radius ever built on a B&M roller coaster.

On May 24, 2006 the park held a one-day "Pre-Opening" which invited guests and officials to ride. Proceeds benefitted the building of a school in Malawi in the context of the "RTL Spendenmarathon".

Reception

References

Roller coasters in Germany
Roller coasters introduced in 2006
Inverted roller coasters manufactured by Bolliger & Mabillard